The International Journal of Extreme Manufacturingis a quarterly peer-reviewed open-access scientific journal covering extreme manufacturing, ranging from fundamentals to process, measurement and systems, as well as materials, structures, and devices with extreme functionalities. The journal was established in 2019.

Abstracting and indexing
The journal is abstracted and indexed in:
Science Citation Index Expanded
Chemical Abstracts Service
Ei Compendex
Scopus
 Inspec
 NASA Astrophysics Data System
 ProQuest databases

According to the Journal Citation Reports, the journal has a 2021 impact factor of 10.036.

References

External links

Mechanical engineering journals
English-language journals
Publications established in 2019
IOP Publishing academic journals